Below are the results of the second season of the Latin American Poker Tour (LAPT). All currency amounts are in US dollars.

Results

LAPT San José 
 Casino: Ramada Plaza Herradura
 Buy-in: $3,700
 3-Day Event: Monday, November 3, 2008, to Wednesday, November 5, 2008
 Number of buy-ins: 219
 Total Prize Pool: $1,000,000
 Number of Payouts: 24
 Winning Hand:

LAPT Nuevo Vallarta 
 Casino: Marival Resort and Suites
 Buy-in: $2,700
 3-Day Event: Friday, December 5, 2008, to Sunday, December 7, 2008
 Number of buy-ins: 242
 Total Prize Pool: $586,850
 Number of Payouts:89
 Note: the 2008 PokerStars.net LAPT Nuevo Vallarta, Mexico event was canceled due to local gaming officials making a decision in the middle of play on Day 1 to rescind the LAPT's gaming license, PokerStars, who host the event, has said that the remaining 89 players will receive $5,000 and a divided remainder of the prize pool based on each player's chip count and an extra $500 paid by PokerStars as a courtesy.

LAPT Viña del Mar 
 Casino: Enjoy Viña del Mar Casino & Resort
 Buy-in: $3,500
 3-Day Event: Tuesday, January 20, 2009, to Thursday, January 22, 2009
 Number of buy-ins: 216
 Total Prize Pool: $523,800
 Number of Payouts: 27
 Winning Hand:

LAPT Punta del Este 
 Casino: Mantra Resort Spa Casino
 Buy-in: $3,500
 3-Day Event: Wednesday, March 18, 2009, to Friday, March 20, 2009
 Number of buy-ins: 327
 Total Prize Pool: $1,110,200
 Number of Payouts: 36
 Winning Hand:

LAPT Mar del Plata 
 Casino: Casino Central
 Buy-in: $5,000
 4-Day Event: Thursday, April 16, 2009, to Sunday, April 19, 2009
 Number of buy-ins: 291
 Total Prize Pool: $1,411,350
 Number of Payouts: 27
 Winning Hand:

References 

Latin American Poker Tour
2008 in poker
2009 in poker